December Poems is an album by American jazz bassist Gary Peacock, with Norwegian saxophonist Jan Garbarek added on two selections, recorded in 1977 and released on the ECM label in 1979.

Reception
The Allmusic review by David R. Adler awarded the album 3 stars stating "Despite the sparse and somewhat cold feeling of the record, Peacock's virtuosity and sterling tone are well-served in a solo format".

Track listing
All compositions by Gary Peacock
 "Snow Dance" - 7:24 
 "Winterlude" - 6:02 
 "A Northern Tale" - 6:18 
 "December Greenwings" - 7:44 
 "Flower Crystals" - 5:09 
 "Celebrations" - 9:49
Recorded at Talent Studio in Oslo, Norway in December 1977.

Personnel
 Gary Peacock — bass
 Jan Garbarek (tracks 2 & 4) — tenor saxophone, soprano saxophone

References

ECM Records albums
Gary Peacock albums
1979 albums
Albums produced by Manfred Eicher